Team Ico was a Japanese video game development studio led by game designer Fumito Ueda. It was part of Sony Interactive Entertainment Japan Studio's Product Development Department #1, and had developed the games Ico and Shadow of the Colossus, both for the PlayStation 2. The team was also initially responsible for The Last Guardian before Ueda's departure in 2011 and the formation of a new company taking over development in 2014. Their games are usually characterized by minimalist storytelling and gameplay, an atmospheric use of bloom and high dynamic range rendering (HDR) lighting, and use of fictional languages. Their products are frequently cited as examples of video games as an art form.

Projects
In February 2007, Team Ico took out a full page advertisement in the Japanese gaming magazine Famitsu. The advertisement featured some early concept sketches on note paper, suggesting that the team's new game was then in the early phases of design. The following year, Sony updated its careers section with the first screenshot of Team Ico's third game headed to PlayStation 3. Posts available were for planners, animators, artists and effect designers. In March 2009, Fumito Ueda, the lead designer of Ico and Shadow of the Colossus, said the new game, "might be something similar to what's been done.... The essence of the game is rather close to Ico."

A video released in the weeks before E3 2009 showed early footage of the game with its working title, Project Trico. The video shows a young boy befriending a griffin-like creature, which appears to combine the functionality of Yorda from Ico with that of Agro and the colossi from Shadow of the Colossus, acting both as a companion and as a form of transportation which can be freely climbed upon. E3 2009 revealed the project's release title as The Last Guardian. Eurogamer reported that The Last Guardian had been posted for release for October 7, 2011 by UK retailers Asda, Tesco, Zavvi, The Hut, and Woolworths. Sony had stated that the game would make its release in the fall of 2011. After the first two God of War games were ported for the PlayStation 3, Ueda mentioned in an interview at the Tokyo Games Show of an interest to do the same with both Ico and Shadow of the Colossus. The Ico & Shadow of the Colossus Collection was confirmed at the 2010 Tokyo Game Show, and was released worldwide in September 2011.

During E3 2015, four years after the game had last been seen, Sony aired an official trailer for The Last Guardian, revealing along with it that the game was to be released in 2016 for the PlayStation 4. The trailer revealed that production was shifted to a new company founded by Ueda and other former staff known as genDESIGN, while Japan Studio would focus on programming and implementation. While the closure of Team Ico was never formally announced by Sony, it was predicated on Ueda's departure from Sony in 2011, following by several other members of the Team Ico staff the following year. Most of these became part of genDESIGN, the studio that completed the development of The Last Guardian.

Games

References

Defunct video game companies of Japan
Video game companies established in 1997
Video game companies disestablished in 2011
PlayStation Studios
Video game development companies
Japanese companies established in 1997
Japanese companies disestablished in 2011